Alexandru Melniciuc (born 29 March 2005) is a Romanian professional footballer who plays as an attacking midfielder or forward for Universitatea Craiova.

References

External links
 
 Alexandru Melniciuc at prosportbucuresti.ro

2005 births
Living people
Sportspeople from Arad, Romania
Romanian footballers
Association football forwards
Liga I players
Liga III players
LPS HD Clinceni players
CS Universitatea Craiova players
Romania youth international footballers